The Chilling Stars is a non-fiction book about the possible causes and effects of global climate change by Henrik Svensmark and Nigel Calder. The paperback version was published by Totem Books on March 19, 2003. An updated version titled The Chilling Stars: A New Theory of Climate Change was published in 2007. Svensmark is otherwise known as a Danish physicist and professor, while Calder had worked as a science journalist.

The authors argue that cloud cover changes caused by variations in cosmic rays are a major contributor to global temperature increases, and they state that human influences have been exaggerated.

Contents and background

The authors describe a cross-disciplinary theory that takes in elements of cosmology, particle physics, paleo-climatology, and meteorology. They label their concept 'cosmoclimatology', and they attempt to look back through prior climate trends such as the Medieval Warm Period and the Little Ice Age. They detail what they view as a close correlation between the rate of cosmic rays reaching the earth, which vary based on electromagnetic fluctuation on the sun's surface, and earth's temperature.

They write how the solar magnetic field grew over twice as strong as before over the 20th century, and they peg this as a primary driver of the approximately 0.6 °C warming over that time. Specifically, they state that fewer cosmic rays cause fewer clouds to form, and thus the climate becomes hotter, given that the individual water droplets that make up clouds collect when cosmic particles turn water into ions.

Reviews

The online magazine londonbookreview.com remarked, "For those who believe that the argument about the causes of climate change have been settled may find this a difficult book to read. But those who retain an open mind may find this an interesting read, even if it is only to confirm that the science is far from being settled."

Scientists have generally not found the published work of Svensmark et al. persuasive. For example, Lockwood et al. find that "The cloud-cosmic ray suggestion increasingly fails to match observations". A joint Spanish/Japanese collaboration of solar ray/astrophysics experts found that the change in global cloud cover is closely correlated with El Niño–Southern Oscillation and uncorrelated with solar rays.

See also
 Scientific opinion on climate change
 The Great Global Warming Swindle
 The Cloud Mystery

References

External links
Book Excerpt from news.bbc.co.uk

Climate change books
2003 non-fiction books
2003 in the environment
2007 in the environment
Environmental non-fiction books